The 2022 FAI Cup is the 102nd edition of the Republic of Ireland's primary national cup competition. This edition features teams from the League of Ireland Premier Division and the First Division, as well as non-league teams. The competition began with qualifying on the week ending 22 April 2022.
 
The winners of the FAI Cup earns automatic qualification for the 2023–24 UEFA Europa Conference League.

Teams 
The FAI Cup is a knockout competition with 38 teams taking part. The competitors consist of the 19 teams from the Football League system (20 teams from the Premier Division and 9 from the First Division) plus 19 teams from the regional leagues (levels 3–7 of the Republic of Ireland football league system).

Preliminary round

The six Preliminary Round ties began over the weekend of the 22nd of April with the First Round proper due to be played on 29-31 July. Seven non-league teams received byes into the First round: Bangor Celtic, Bonagee United, Cockhill United, Lucan United, Malahide United, Maynooth University Town and Oliver Bond Celtic.

First round
The draw for the First Round was made on 21 June 2022., consisting of the 6 winners from the previous round, all 19 members of the League of Ireland and seven teams who received byes from the preliminary round. The round included three teams from the seventh tier, the lowest-ranked teams remaining in the competition: Pike Rovers, Salthill Devon and Villa FC.

Matches

Second round
The draw for the Second Round took place on 2 August 2022. Con Murphy hosted proceedings with former FAI Cup winners Alan Keane and Declan 'Fabio' O'Brien making the draw. The draw consisted of the 16 winners from the previous round: 7 teams from the Premier Division, 5 from First Division and 4 non-league outfits. The round included four teams from the third tier, the lowest-ranked teams remaining in the competition: Bonagee United, Lucan United, Malahide United and Maynooth University Town.

Quarter-final
The draw for the quarter final took place on 30 August 2022 and all ties were played the week ending Sunday 18 September 2022. The draw consisted of the 8 winners from the previous round: 6 teams from the Premier Division and 2 from First Division. The round included two teams from the second tier, the lowest-ranked teams remaining in the competition: Treaty United and Waterford.

Semi-final
The draw for the semi-final took place on 18 September 2022.

A total of 4 teams were in the semi-final draw: 2 teams from the Premier Division and 2 from First Division.

All ties were played on Sunday 16 October 2022.

Final

References

FAI Cup seasons
FAI Cup
2022 in Republic of Ireland association football cups